Gloǵi is a village in the municipality of Tearce, North Macedonia.

Demographics
According to the 2002 census, the village had a total of 1,295 inhabitants. Ethnic groups in the village include:

Albanians 983
Macedonians 310
Turks 1 
Others 1

References

External links

Villages in Tearce Municipality
Albanian communities in North Macedonia